The Hobbiton Movie Set is a significant location used for The Lord of the Rings film trilogy and The Hobbit film trilogy. It is situated on a family-run farm about 8 kilometres (5.0 mi) west of Hinuera and 10 kilometres (6.2 mi) southwest of Matamata, in Waikato, New Zealand, and is now a Tolkien tourism destination, offering a guided tour of the set.

Pre-film set history 

The geology of the area is that of the Hinuera Formation, a group of alluvial silts, sands and gravels laid down in the last glacial period. Originally largely marshland, it was transformed in the 19th century by a large-scale drainage scheme and is now fertile agricultural land and a major racehorse breeding area.

The Alexander family moved to the  property of rolling grassland where the set is located in 1978. Since then it has been a livestock ranch with 13,000 sheep and 300 Angus beef cattle. The main sources of income from farming are mutton, wool and beef.

The Lord of the Rings 

When Peter Jackson began to look for suitable locations for The Lord of the Rings film series, he first saw the Alexander Farm during an aerial search in 1998 and concluded that the area was "like a slice of ancient England". Set Decorator Alan Lee commented that the location's hills "looked as though Hobbits had already begun excavations". Part of the site has a lake with a long arm that could double as a river.

After suitable negotiations with the owners, work commenced in transforming part of the farm into sets for Hobbiton and other parts of J. R. R. Tolkien's Shire in March 1999. The New Zealand Army brought in heavy equipment to make  of road into the site from the nearest local road and initial ground works. Further work included building the facades for 37 hobbit holes and associated gardens and hedges, a mill and double arch bridge, and erecting a  oak above Bag End that had been growing near Matamata and which was cut down and recreated on site complete with artificial leaves. Thatch on the pub and mill roofs was made from rushes growing on the farm. Generators were installed and water and sewerage also had to be considered. Catering was made available for up to 400 cast, crew and visitors per day.

Jackson wrote: "I knew Hobbiton needed to be warm, comfortable and feel lived in. By letting the weeds grow through the cracks and establishing hedges and little gardens a year before filming, we ended up with an incredibly real place, not just a film set". Lee commented that "it was satisfying to see that it had taken on something of the look of the Devonshire countryside I'd lived in for the past twenty-five years".

Filming The Hobbit 

The original set was not built to last, the hobbit hole facades having been constructed from untreated timber, ply and polystyrene and partially torn down after filming. In 2010, the set was rebuilt in a more permanent fashion for The Hobbit: An Unexpected Journey, filming for which began in 2011. Ian McKellen reprised his role as Gandalf the Grey and was joined on the Hobbiton location by Martin Freeman, who remarked that the site "just looked like a place where people lived and where people worked".

Visitor centre 

Guided tours of the  movie set site commenced in 2002 and continue to be provided daily. The two-hour excursion is very popular, and advance bookings are recommended.

Highlights of the tour include Bagshot Row, the Party Tree, and Bilbo's Bag End home. There are now 44 hobbit holes on view although it is only possible to enter a few of them, all of which have small, unfinished, earth-walled interiors. (The interior of Bag End was shot in a studio in Wellington). The hobbit holes on site have been designed and built to one of three different scales.  In addition to the smallest ones built to the correct size (hobbits are smaller than humans), some are built to a larger scale to make the hobbit actors appear smaller, and some have been constructed in a "dwarf" scale for scenes containing dwarves.  Apart from a few exceptions, the colour of the front door indicates the scale, for example hobbit holes with a blue door are built to the correct scale for humans.

Refreshments are available at "The Shires Rest Cafe" prior to or after tours. Breakfast and indeed "Second Breakfast" is served. In 2012 the "Green Dragon" inn (a replica of the Green Dragon that featured in the LOTR and Hobbit trilogies) was opened on the set. There is now also a store selling merchandise and souvenirs adjacent to the cafe and evening events commenced in 2014. The tours have generally received good reviews. In 2013 the set welcomed its 500,000th guest.

References

Bibliography

 Ian Brodie (2004) The Lord of the Rings Location Guidebook. (Extended Edition). HarperCollins. Auckland.
 Charles Rawlings-Way, Brett Atkinson, Sarah Bennett, Peter Dragicevich and Errol Hunt (2008) Lonely Planet New Zealand. Lonely Planet. Melbourne.

Matamata
The Hobbit (film series)
The Lord of the Rings (film series)
Tourist attractions in Hamilton, New Zealand
Tourist attractions in Waikato
Shire (Middle-earth)